Inspector Steel is an Indian superhero published by Raj Comics.

Origin
Inspector Amar lost some major parts of his body after an accident. In order to save his life, his brain was placed into a mechanical body; making him a cyborg. His friend, Professor Anees, was the one who performed this operation.

Inspector Steel is composed of armor plating, ICs, chips, various weapon systems, and electronic wizardry. The only human part within him is his brain, which is wired to the rest of the systems.

Attributes

Height: 7 feet (2.1 m)

Weight: 450 kg (1,000 lb)

Mainframe : Stainless steel

Age: 5 years as Ins. Steel

Area of Operation : Raj Nagar

Rank : Police Inspector

Powers and abilities
He is a heavily armored cyborg who cannot be harmed by simple weapons.
He has x-ray vision, a fully automatic bullet and rocket firing Megagun, scanners and many digital equipments such as a lie detector machine, fax etc. built in. Normal bullets and bombs can not harm him. His body is completely resistive to any outside interference. Being a heavily armored cyborg, he can run at superhuman speed and also, he uses his own stunning bike which is made up of automatic built-up system.

Family, Friends, and Allies
 Inspector Salma
 Professor Anees

Enemies
 Dr virus 
 Mechanic, a man who hates machines
 Hammer
 Farsa
 Sir Gunga
 Auzaar

References

Comics characters with superhuman strength
Inspector Steel
Raj Comics superheroes
Fictional Indian police officers
Fictional cyborgs
Fictional Indian people
Fictional amputees
Indian superheroes